Nils Johansson (politician)  (1864–1941) was a Swedish politician. He was a member of the Centre Party.

References
This article was initially translated from the Swedish Wikipedia article.

Centre Party (Sweden) politicians
1864 births
1941 deaths